USS Ocoee (SP-1208) was a United States Navy patrol vessel in commission from 1917 to 1918.

Ocoee was built in 1911 as a private motorboat of the same name by the Matthews Boat Building Company at Port Clinton, Ohio. On 24 August 1917, the U.S. Navy chartered her from her owner, H. Walter Blumenthal of New York City, for use as a section patrol vessel during World War I. She was commissioned as USS Ocoee (SP-1208) on 17 September 1917.

Assigned to the 3rd Naval District, Ocoee was tasked with patrol duties in the New York City area. However, on either 5 or 6 July 1918 she was reported to be unfit for naval service, and the Commandant, 3rd Naval District ordered her returned to Blumenthal. After a delay of over six months, she finally was returned to Blumenthal on 17 January 1919.

Notes

References

Department of the Navy Naval History and Heritage Command Online Library of Selected Images: U.S. Navy Ships: USS Ocoee (SP-1208), 1917-1919. Originally the civilian motor boat Ocoee.
NavSource Online: Section Patrol Craft Photo Archive: Ocoee (SP 1208)

Patrol vessels of the United States Navy
World War I patrol vessels of the United States
Ships built in Port Clinton, Ohio
1911 ships